Sir Ralph Kohn FRS FMedSci FBPhS (9 December 1927 – 11 November 2016) was a British medical scientist, recipient of the Queen's Award for Export Achievement for his work in the pharmaceutical industry.

Early life
Sir Ralph was born in Leipzig. Raised in an Orthodox Jewish family with three other siblings, the Kohn family fled to Amsterdam upon the rise of Hitler in 1933. The Kohns, in May 1940, arrived as refugees in Manchester, via Wigan on the last boat that carried Jewish refugees from Holland to England.

Education
Educated at Salford Grammar School, Sir Ralph won a scholarship to the University of Manchester where he obtained a PhD in pharmacology.

Career and research
After completing his PhD, Sir Ralph pursued post-doctoral studies in Rome with Professor Ernst Chain and at the Albert Einstein College of Medicine in New York. 
Sir Ralph, after a successful stint at Smith, Kline & French, set up Advisory Services, a pioneering company that conducted independent drugs trials for the pharmaceutical industry.
In 1991, Sir Ralph set up the Kohn Foundation, which supports research and innovation in science and medicine, as well as the arts and education. The foundation endows several prizes for young scientists and musicians. It supports the Royal Society Kohn Award for science broadcasting and the Royal Academy of Music Bach Prize and the Royal Academy of Music / Kohn Foundation Bach Cantata Series.

Awards and honours
Sir Ralph was elected an Honorary Fellow of the Royal Society in 2006, in recognition of his contributions to science via the Kohn Foundation. He was also an honorary fellow of the Academy of Medical Sciences. In November 2008, he delivered the Bynum Tudor Lecture at Kellogg College, Oxford.

He was knighted in the 2010 New Year Honours for services to science, music and charity.

Personal life
Sir Ralph married Zahava Kanarek, a lecturer and Holocaust survivor, in 1963, in Amsterdam. The couple had three daughters: Hephzibah (a medical researcher), Michelle, and Maxine.

Sir Ralph was a long-serving member of Golders Green Synagogue and an attendee and benefactor of Shomrei Hadath. 
His main interests were music and singing (as a baritone), chess, and studying Talmud.  In 2004, he was a guest on Sue Lawley's BBC Radio 4 radio programme, Desert Island Discs.

Kohn financed John Eliot Gardiner's Bach Cantatas project: We should give them [artists] the sort of means which will allow them to lead a reasonable existence where they can devote themselves with heart, soul and body to their work", Kohn says. "But the patron should not be their possessor. As Clifford Curzon once said: 'Isn't it nice that we can give something to young artists so that we can lift them closer to the stars.' That's all it's about.

Kohn died on 11 November 2016, aged 88.

References 

1927 births
2016 deaths
People educated at Salford Grammar School
Jewish emigrants from Nazi Germany to the United Kingdom
British businesspeople
Honorary Fellows of the Royal Society
Fellows of the Academy of Medical Sciences (United Kingdom)
Knights Bachelor